Ahmed Khalil (born 1991) is an Emirati association football player.

It may also refer to:

 Ahmed Khalil (born 1994), Tunisian association football player
 Ahmad Khaleel (born 1970), Saudi Arabian association football player
 Ahmed Khalil Al-Khaldi (born 1972), Qatari footballer
 Ahmed Khalil El-Giddawi (born 1931), Egyptian gymnast

See also
 Khalil Ahmed (disambiguation)